Afraurantium is a genus of flowering plants belonging to the family Rutaceae.

Its native range is Western Tropical Africa.

Species:

Afraurantium senegalense

References

Rutaceae
Rutaceae genera
Taxa named by Auguste Chevalier